Sahiba Ali gizi Gafarova (19 March 1955) is a professor, Doctor of Sciences of philology, Deputy and Chairman of the National Assembly of Azerbaijan.

Biography
Gafarova was born on March 19, 1955, in Shamkir. She graduated from Faculty of Russian Language and Literature of Azerbaijan Pedagogical Institute of Russian Language and Literature and Faculty of English Philology of Azerbaijan Pedagogical Institute of Foreign Languages. In 1978–1981 she worked as a secondary school teacher in Shamkir. In 1981–2020 she worked as a laboratory assistant, teacher, senior teacher, associate professor, professor of Azerbaijan Pedagogical Institute of Russian Language and Literature, dean of Western languages faculty of Western University, head of European languages department of Baku Slavic University. In 2004–2020, Gafarova worked as Vice-Rector for International Relations of Baku Slavic University. From 2006 to 2007, she worked at University of Michigan Institute for Women and Gender Studies under the US State Department's Fulbright Scholarship Program. In 2015–2020, she served as Deputy Chairman of Committee on Family, Women and Children of National Assembly. From 2013 to 2015, she chaired the subcommittees of Parliamentary Assembly of the Council of Europe on Gender Equality and Racism and Xenophobia.

From 2015–2017, she was a Political Coordinator of Parliamentary Assembly of the Council of Europe's "Women Free from Violence" Parliamentary Network, Rapporteur on Violence Against Women, Chairman of the Committee on Migration, Refugees and IDP of Parliamentary Assembly of the Council of Europe, and member of the Bureau. In 2018–2020, she was the head of Azerbaijani delegation to the Euronest Parliamentary Assembly. Gafarova has been a member of New Azerbaijan Party since 2004, and a deputy of 4th, 5th and 6th convocations of Milli Majlis.

Awards
 Honored Teacher of the Republic of Azerbaijan — 14 December 2016.
 Order "Hyzmatdaşlygy ösdürmäge goşandy üçin"

References

External links
 
 

1955 births
People from Shamkir District
New Azerbaijan Party politicians
Chairmen of the National Assembly (Azerbaijan)
living people
Azerbaijan University of Languages alumni
Baku Slavic University alumni
Azerbaijani professors
Azerbaijani schoolteachers
21st-century Azerbaijani women politicians
21st-century Azerbaijani politicians
Women legislative speakers
Members of the 4th convocation of the National Assembly (Azerbaijan)
Members of the 5th convocation of the National Assembly (Azerbaijan)
Members of the 6th convocation of the National Assembly (Azerbaijan)